Span Developments Limited was a British property development company formed in the late 1950s by Geoffrey Townsend working in long and close partnership with Eric Lyons as consultant architect. During its most successful period in the 1960s, Span built over 2,000 homes in London, Surrey, Kent and East Sussex – mainly two- and three-bedroom single-family homes and apartment buildings.

Formation
Lyons and Townsend first met whilst studying architecture at evening-classes at the Regent Street Polytechnic in the 1930s. Townsend started his first architectural practice, Modern Homes, in Richmond in 1937 and Lyons joined soon after. Commissions were sparse in the immediate pre-war period but they reunited after the war, working mostly on war-damage restoration and house alteration projects and the business progressed. In 1948 they secured a contract to design a development of 24 flats in Whitton. This development, Oaklands, exhibited many of the features of their subsequent successful style.

Features
Span were notable for several characteristics, radical for their time, that continue to inspire and influence. Lyons and Townsend shared a vision of social housing. 

Architecturally, their designs combined modernist design with attention to detail and harmony with the suburban environment. Their house designs usually had mono-pitch roofs with large, clerestory high level windows and open-plan interiors. However, these were softened by more traditional features such as hung tiles and stock brick work.

The Span ethos was to build "homes within a garden", so most developments include large integrated landscape communal gardens. The exterior space is a recognised feature and many Span developments are car-free – a radical difference from other post war developments. Concealed communal parking was deliberately located to encourage opportunities for social interaction.

Commercially, Lyons and Townsend targeted the young professional first-time property-buyer market and deliberately kept costs low, working to lower profit margins than established contemporaries. The use of modular designs and the fabrication of some components on-site also helped keep construction costs as low as possible. The relatively high housing density also added to the economies but was often a matter of conflict with planning authorities.

Span, and Townsend in particular, promoted the concept of a legally constituted Residents' Association, membership of which was a condition of sale, and which included covenants that placed mutual obligations on the residents to maintain the properties and grounds.

Key projects
In 1953, frustrated with a lack of support from developers and funders for their ideas for modern economic housing, Townsend established Bargood Estates, a development company of his own in conjunction with Henry Cushman, an agent for the Alliance Building Society.

To become a developer, Townsend had to resign from RIBA due to their conflict of interest rules of the time. Although the partnership with Lyons was legally ended, they continued to share the same business premises, the studio offices at Lyons' home, Mill House, East Molesey, maintaining their close collaboration.

Span went on to develop 73 schemes, comprising 2,134 dwellings, up to the end of the 1960s.

Parkleys

Townsend and Cushman acquired four acres of the former Ham Farm Nursery near Ham Common, Ham, London, and the adjacent Cairn House, formerly known as The Elms, that fronted the Upper Ham Road. With Lyons as consultant architect, the development, Parkleys, comprised 169 flats across fifteen two and three-storey H-plan blocks and a block of six shops and maisonettes set in high quality landscaping that carefully retained many mature trees and plantings from the former properties. The Elms was demolished to make way for the scheme. Wates were the builder. As the project progressed, Townsend and Cushman were joined by another former Regent Street Polytechnic student, Leslie Bilsby (who had previously worked with Ernő Goldfinger and Denys Lasdun), to form Priory Hall Ltd. Towards the end of the project, in 1955, landscape architect, Ivor Cunningham joined Lyons practice. A final addition to the landscaping at Parkleys was the commission of a statue, Pastorale, by artist, Keith Godwin, unveiled in 1956 by Sir Hugh Casson and filmed by Pathé. Parkleys won several awards and established Lyons and Townsend's reputation. 
In the late 1950s, Townsend moved the development company to one of the properties within Parkleys. All fifteen blocks, named after poets, were listed Grade II in December 1998. Along with the adjacent Ham Farm Road, Parkleys was declared a conservation area in 2003.

The Priory
Bilsby had acquired land in Blackheath near to his home, and this  became the group's next project, The Priory. This was the first of nineteen developments in Blackheath and of thirteen within the Cator estate. Constructed between 1954 and 1956, the development comprised 61 flats of type A, B and C and, like Parkleys, care was taken to retain the estate's mature trees.

In 1957, Bilsby gave up his other business interests and committed his time to Priory Hall Ltd. The name "SPAN Developments" came into use in the early 1960s, deriving from the company's stated aim to "span the gap between the suburban monotony of the typical 'spec building' and the architecturally designed individually built residence".

In 1961, Danish landscape architect Preben Jacobsen (1934–2012) joined Lyons' practice.

Cedar Chase 
24 houses of type C30, set on a sloping site in Taplow, South Buckinghamshire. Cedar Chase is one of the best-preserved examples of Span's work. It was controversial when built, but is explicitly included in the Taplow Village Conservation Area "because of the high quality of its design and the way it blends in with the landscape".

Marsham Lodge
Marsham Lodge, 25 houses in communal gardens in Gerrards Cross built in 1969, was one of the last developments to be completed under the Span Developments company name. Like Cedar Chase, Marsham Lodge uses only the C30 house design which was not used on any other development.

New Ash Green and after
The ambitious New Ash Green project, an entire village conceived by Span, dating from 1966, hit substantial financial difficulties, causing Lyons to withdraw and Bilsby and Townsend to resign. Townsend worked independently as a developer for several years thereafter. Bilsby and Townsend reunited in the late 1970s and formed SPAN Environments Ltd, working once more with Lyons and Cunningham as consultant architects, with Gostling, the builder from New Ash Green, doing the construction. Together they constructed four further developments in Blackheath and New Mallard Place in Teddington. The latter was conceived before Lyons' death in 1980 and completed in 1984, by which time Townsend was in his early 70s.

List of developments

References

Bibliography

External links
 

Property companies of the United Kingdom
Modernist architecture
British companies established in 1956
Real estate companies established in 1956
1956 establishments in England